The AN/UYK-8 was a UNIVAC computer.

Development
In April 1967, UNIVAC received a contract from the U.S. Navy for design, development, testing and delivery of the AN/UYK-8 microelectronics computer for use with the AN/TYA-20.

The AN/UYK-8 was built to replace the CP-808 (Marine Corps air cooled AN/USQ-20 variant) in the Beach Relay Link-11 communication system, the AN/TYQ-3 in a AN/TYA-20

Technical 
It used the same 30-bit words and instruction set as the AN/USQ-17 and AN/USQ-20 Naval Tactical Data System (NTDS) computers, built with "first generation integrated circuits". This made it about one quarter of the volume of the AN/USQ-20. It had two processors instead of just one.

Instructions were represented as 30-bit words, in the following format:
   f  6 bits   function code 
   j  3 bits   jump condition designator 
   k  3 bits   partial word designator 
   b  3 bits   which seven index register to use (B0=non used) 
   s  2 bits   which S (5bits) register to use S0,S1,S2,S3(P(17-13))
   y  13 bits  operand address in memory
   memory address=Bb+Ss+y=18bit(262144Words)

Numbers were represented as full 30-bit words, this allowed for five 6-bit alphanumeric characters per word.

The main memory was increased to 262,144 words (256K words) of magnetic core memory.

The available processor registers were:
one 30-bit arithmetic (A) register.
a contiguous 30-bit Q register (total of 60 bits for the result of multiplication or the dividend in division).
seven 30-bit index (B) registers.

See also
List of UNIVAC products
History of computing hardware

References

UNIVAC hardware
Military computers
Military electronics of the United States